Pelochyta haemapleura is a moth of the family Erebidae. It was described by Paul Dognin in 1914. It is found in Colombia.

References

Pelochyta
Moths described in 1914